The Infinite Man is a 2014 Australian science fiction film directed by Hugh Sullivan.

Plot 
Dean, a scientist, wants to relive a romantic weekend with his girlfriend, Lana. After they are interrupted by Lana's ex-boyfriend, Terry, Dean tries to fix things by going back in time.

Cast
Josh McConville as Dean
Hannah Marshall as Lana
Alex Dimitriades as Terry

Release
The movie was released in France (on demand) on 25 June 2015.

Reception
The Infinite Man received favourable reviews from film critics. Rotten Tomatoes reports a 94% approval rating and an average score of 7.86/10, based on 18 reviews.

Luke Buckmaster of Guardian Australia gave it five stars.

References

External links
 
 
 

2014 films
Australian science fiction comedy films
2010s science fiction comedy films
2014 comedy films
Time loop films
2010s English-language films
2010s Australian films